Johnny Grier (April 16, 1947 – March 8, 2022) was an American football official for 23 years in the National Football League (NFL) from 1981 to 2004.  He began in the NFL as a field judge before becoming the first African-American referee in the history of the NFL with the start of the 1988 NFL season.  Grier officiated in one Super Bowl, Super Bowl XXII in 1988, which was his last game as a field judge and the same game in which Doug Williams became the first African-American quarterback to win the Super Bowl.  On the field, he wore uniform number 23, which is now worn by Jerome Boger, another African-American referee.

Grier attended college at the University of the District of Columbia.

Grier began officiating football at age 18 and started as a [Dunbar High School] football official in 1965, later moved on to college football in 1972, and eventually the NFL in 1981. In 1989, a year after becoming a referee, he oversaw the head coaching debut of Art Shell, the first black NFL head coach in the NFL's modern era.

Grier served as an officiating supervisor for the NFL and previously as Supervisor of Football Officials for the Mid-Eastern Athletic Conference (MEAC).
His career ended abruptly during the 2004 NFL season when he was forced to retire due to a leg injury suffered during a series of games.  He was replaced by the back judge on his crew, Scott Green, who had previous experience as a referee in NFL Europe. He later served as an officiating supervisor for the NFL and previously as Supervisor of Football Officials for the Mid-Eastern Athletic Conference (MEAC). After leaving the NFL as a Supervisor of Football Officials, he was hired as a PAC 12 Supervisor, where he later retired.

Grier died in Pasadena, Maryland, on March 8, 2022, at the age of 74.

References

1947 births
2022 deaths
20th-century African-American sportspeople
21st-century African-American people
African-American sports officials
National Football League officials
Sportspeople from Charlotte, North Carolina
University of the District of Columbia alumni